Loryma athalialis is a species of snout moth in the genus Loryma. It was described by Francis Walker in 1859 and is known from the Democratic Republic of the Congo, South Africa (the type location is Cape Town) and Madagascar (including Tananarive).

References

Moths described in 1859
Pyralini
Insects of the Democratic Republic of the Congo
Moths of Africa